Simon Gipson, OAM has worked in education as a teacher, administrator and consultant in Australia, Thailand, Hong Kong, New Zealand, the United Kingdom and the United States. He is currently the CEO of The Song Room, Chairman of The Association of Coeducational Schools (ACS), Chair of the Trinity Grammar School Council, and sits on the board of the Association of Independent Schools Victoria (AISV).

Professional career
Gipson taught English and Drama at several independent schools in Western Australia before becoming Deputy Headmaster at Guildford Grammar School. In 1996, he was appointed Principal of Tridhos School Village, a project in Northern Thailand designed to introduce educational reform and best practice teaching and learning in South East Asia.

Gipson was appointed Headmaster of Melbourne independent school, St Michael's Grammar School, in 2000. He succeeded previous Headmaster Tony Hewison, who had been head there for 20 years. Gipson immediately started major reform at the school, and as a result has become well known due to this avant garde approach to education.

Gipson has been a notable commentator on educational issue, including authoring several articles published in The Age, a leading Melbourne newspaper.

In 2020, he became the Chair of School Council at Trinity Grammar School, Kew.

Educational reform
Gipson has published and presented in various areas of educational reform and restructuring, in redefining teacher professionalism, and in the application of Information Technology in teaching and learning. In 2002, he was invited as an International Research Associate for the United Kingdom National College for School Leadership to investigate the leadership implications of the implementation of Information Technology in English schools.

Media appearances

The Age Newspaper
 Private, public schools hit out at PM's 'values' claim, The Age, 2004-01-21
 The price of going private, The Age & Sydney Morning Herald, 2002-02-13
 The Hard Sell, The Age, 2005-09-21
 Review may ban strap in schools, The Age, 2004-09-04
 Downloading Porn Out of Home, The Age, 2003-03-05
 Laptops, iPods, are they friend or fiend, The Age, 2005-10-14
 School Fears over Salvo Crisis Centre, The Age, 2005-09-22
 Schools call in class acts to give them the edge, The Age, 2005-08-13
 Schools likely to accept corporal punishment ban, The Age, 2002-02-13
 Technology can't replace school environment
Fury as under-age girls used to sex up nightclub

ABC Broadcast
 Public Versus Private Schools, George Negus Tonight (Transcript), ABC, 2004-04-01

Other
 Parliament of Victoria Parliamentary Debates (Hansard), 2000-05-25 (Pg 1784  (28 of 102))
 St Michael's Grammar School Adds New Meaning to the Virtual Classroom, Voice&Data.com.au, 2000-09-02
 ICT, teaching and learning and school design. Reflections on the UK context — Incorporated Association of Registered Teachers of Victoria (IARTV)
The challenges of integrating information technology into a Thai educational setting: The story of Tridhos School Village, Chiang Mai — Ed' Tech 98
Planning technology for schools: A design methodology. — Ed' Tech 98
Situating learning with the help of the World Wide Web — Teaching & Learning Forum 2001
Issues of ICT in Education — National College for School Leadership

References

Australian headmasters
Heads of schools in Thailand
Living people
Year of birth missing (living people)
Guildford Grammar School
Australian expatriates in Thailand